Kenneth Hardwick (6 January 1924 – 4 June 1977) was an English footballer who played as a goalkeeper for Doncaster Rovers, Scunthorpe United and Barrow.

Playing career
Hardwick first played for Rovers during the war, 26 games in total. From his league debut against Nottingham Forest on 26 December 1947, Hardwick became Rovers first choice keeper. That season Rovers were relegated from The Second Division but in the 1949−50 season they stormed the Third Division North and gained promotion back to League Division 2 where he spent the rest of his time with them.

With the legendary Harry Gregg as his understudy for four seasons, this was a golden period for Doncasters keepers.

In 1955, at the age of 30, Hardwick was invited to an England Under-23 trial. The FA withdrew the invitation once the error was realised.

After Harry Gregg took over his position at Doncaster, he moved first to Scunthorpe, then ended his playing days at Barrow.

References

External links
Profile on doncasterrovers.co.uk
Pathe News video of  Hardwick in goal for Doncaster against Arsenal, 1953 − 3rd Round F.A. Cup

1977 deaths
Footballers from County Durham
Association football goalkeepers
Doncaster Rovers F.C. players
Scunthorpe United F.C. players
Rossington Main F.C. players
Barrow A.F.C. players
English Football League players
English footballers
1924 births
People from West Auckland